Duke Point is a major ferry terminal owned and operated by BC Ferries that provides ferry service across the Strait of Georgia to Tsawwassen. The ferry terminal is located at Duke Point in Nanaimo and is the only major terminal in the BC Ferries system without a public transit connection.

The terminal was built in 1997 for $42 million (equivalent to $67.88 million in 2022) to divert commercial vehicle traffic away from BC Ferries' other main Nanaimo terminal in the heart of the city, thus easing traffic jams through Nanaimo's city centre. It was officially opened on 9 June 1997 by then Premier Glen Clark and saw its first sailings the following day.

In 2013, 42 percent of passengers travelling from Nanaimo to the mainland went through Duke Point.

The ferry terminal marks the southern terminus of Highway 19, which connects the terminal to the Trans-Canada Highway just south of Nanaimo's city centre via the Duke Point Highway. The highway cost $50 million (equivalent to 80.81 million in 2022) to build.

Incidents and accidents

On December 20, 2011, MV Coastal Inspiration experienced a hard landing upon arrival at Duke Point terminal. The terminal berth sustained significant damage and the vessel's port side doors were also damaged. The terminal required extensive repairs, requiring a closure of over four months, with all service re-routed through Departure Bay, finally re-opening on May 1, 2012.

See also

 Tsawwassen ferry terminal
 Departure Bay ferry terminal

Notes

References

External links 
 Seaspan Ferries

BC Ferries
Transport in Nanaimo
Ferry terminals in British Columbia